Mariann Marthinsen (born 9 September 1984) is a Norwegian cross-country skier and swimmer. She won a bronze medal at the 2008 Summer Paralympics, and won Norway's only gold medal at 2014 Winter Paralympics.

Career
Mariann Marthinsen (née Vestbostad) was born on 9 September 1984. Her right leg was amputated when she was two, following a road traffic accident. She attended Western Norway University of Applied Sciences, where she studied Social Work Studies, later going on to become a social worker. In 2003, she began competing in swimming. During the course of her swimming career, she set 17 world records and won a bronze medal at the 2008 Summer Paralympics in Beijing, China, in the women's 100 metre backstroke S8, and also competed in freestyle races.

Also in 2008, she decided to take up cross-country skiing, going on to win the seated skiing World Cup in 2013/14. At the 2014 Winter Paralympics in Sochi, Russia, she won Norway's first gold medal at a Winter Paralympics with a victory in the women's 1km sprint classic, sitting. Marthinsen had led in the prologue round, and then in her heat but entered the final as the third fastest. She entered the last corner in fourth place, but took the lead with a few metres to go. In the 5 km race, one of her skis were damaged early in the race, resulting in Marthinsen finishing in 15th place.

References

Living people
1984 births
Norwegian female cross-country skiers
Norwegian female backstroke swimmers
Norwegian female freestyle swimmers
Paralympic gold medalists for Norway
Paralympic bronze medalists for Norway
Norwegian social workers
Swimmers at the 2004 Summer Paralympics
Swimmers at the 2008 Summer Paralympics
Swimmers at the 2012 Summer Paralympics
Cross-country skiers at the 2014 Winter Paralympics
Medalists at the 2008 Summer Paralympics
Medalists at the 2014 Winter Paralympics
Paralympic medalists in cross-country skiing
Paralympic medalists in swimming
Paralympic swimmers of Norway
Paralympic cross-country skiers of Norway
S8-classified Paralympic swimmers
20th-century Norwegian women
21st-century Norwegian women